Ronald Jay Bass (born March 26, 1942), sometimes credited as Ron Bass, is an American screenwriter and film producer. He won an Academy Award for writing the screenplay for Barry Levinson's film Rain Man, and films that Bass is associated with are regularly nominated for multiple motion picture awards. His films have grossed over $2 billion.

Life and career
Bass was born in Los Angeles, California. From the age of 3 to 11, Bass was afflicted with an undiagnosed condition that kept him bedridden. His symptoms included respiratory problems and stomach pains with high fevers and nausea. It was during this illness, at age six, that Bass is said to have started writing.

During his teens, Bass began work on a novel, which he entitled Voleur. He completed this work at age 17 and showed it to his English teacher. He took her critique of his first completed project quite hard. She described the writing as very good, but she felt that it was too personal to be published. Bass's response was to later burn his manuscript. Later in life, Bass recalled "it was like the voice of God telling me I didn't have what it takes to be a writer, and I should find something practical to do with my life". Bass would revisit his teenage writings later in life.

Bass entered law studies, first at Stanford, then Yale, and finally at Harvard Law School, where he graduated in 1967 with a degree in law. He seemed quite confident about his future prospects, saying, "When I learned there was such a thing as entertainment law, I thought, 'This is where I belong'". Back in Los Angeles, Bass began a seventeen-year career practicing law in the entertainment business. He was successful, and eventually rose to the level of partner in his law firm.

Bass has worked with his sister Diane Bass, who served as an uncredited technical consultant on the film Rain Man.

As he moved up the career ladder in law, the love of writing that Bass had acquired as a child never left him. He started writing again, usually during the predawn hours before going to work. Writing and working at unusual hours became a lifelong habit of his. In 1974, he began to rework his novel Voleur, apparently from memory, as he had burned the manuscript in a fit of pique when he was 17. In 1978, he completed the work, renaming it The Perfect Thief. This was the first of his three published novels. In 1982, Bass published his second novel, Lime's crisis: A novel. The Lime referred to in the title is Harry Lime, the central mystery character of the 1949 motion picture The Third Man. On January 1, 1984, his third novel was published, The Emerald Illusion. The following year, he wrote the screenplay Code Name: Emerald, based on this novel. It was his debut as a screenwriter with a produced script.

As a screenwriter, Bass is known for successfully working in collaboration with other writers, including Amy Tan on The Joy Luck Club and Al Franken on When a Man Loves a Woman. He also collaborated on the script for the 2022 film The King's Daughter.

Ron is currently under contract to write an original Screenplay entitled "Pegasus" for Pegasus Productions Corp.

"The Ronettes"
A small controversy has arisen over Bass's use of assistants to help him write screenplays. While it is common for screenwriters to employ assistants to help them with research and typing, Bass employs six or seven mostly female assistants that one journalist dubbed "The Ronettes". According to Bass, his assistants help him in research and also in critiquing his scripts. They enable him to write, revise, or polish a comparatively large number of screenplays each year.

Works

Novels
 The Perfect Thief, 1978, 
 Lime's crisis: A novel, 1982, 
 The Emerald Illusion, January 1, 1984,

Films
Please see the WGA screenwriting credit system for an explanation of the terms story by, screenplay by, and written by. Also note that under the rules of the Writers Guild of America, Bass has not received on-screen credit for every script he has contributed to. It is thought that Bass has helped to write or consulted on more than 100 screenplays (not all of which have necessarily been produced).

References

External links

 Bass's entry at the Screenwriter's Utopia
 A Harvard Alumni article on Bass
 Commentary on Bass from Lukeford.net
 
 Bio page from the official website of How Stella Got Her Groove Back
 A brief excerpt from Reuters/Variety occurs toward the end of this page from Talent Develop.com
 A MovieMaker.com article featuring a sidebar bio on Bass
 A bio from Screenmancer.tv
 An interview with Sight & Sound

American male screenwriters
Best Original Screenplay Academy Award winners
American television writers
20th-century American novelists
20th-century American male writers
1942 births
Living people
Harvard Law School alumni
American male novelists
American male television writers